Golden Beach is a town in Miami-Dade County, Florida, United States, between the Intracoastal Waterway and Atlantic Ocean. As of the 2020 census, the town had a population of 961.

Geography
It is on the barrier island that separates the Intracoastal Waterway from the ocean; the entire town is about one mile from north to south, and four blocks from east to west. It is bordered to the south by the city of Sunny Isles Beach, to the west by the city of Aventura, and to the north by the city of Hallandale Beach in Broward County.

Golden Beach is known as a very upscale community, and many of its houses are worth over a million dollars. Several celebrities, including Bill Gates, own homes there. Eric Clapton's album 461 Ocean Boulevard was named after the Golden Beach house at that address, a photo of which is also featured on the album cover. High-rise construction and commercial development are not permitted within the town limits.

In 1981, all but one of the roads into the town from A1A were closed as a means of preventing "criminals, curious tourists from nearby hotels, joggers and Haitian refugees" from entering Golden Beach. The blockades remained and the Strand continues to be the only road into town and is still patrolled by a police guardhouse.

Surrounding areas
 Broward County (Hallandale Beach)
 Broward County (Hallandale Beach)    Atlantic Ocean
 Aventura   Atlantic Ocean
 Aventura    Atlantic Ocean
 Sunny Isles Beach

Demographics

2020 census

As of the 2020 United States census, there were 961 people, 190 households, and 156 families residing in the town.

2010 census

As of 2010, there were 355 households, out of which 19.2% were vacant. In 2000, 49.3% had children under the age of 18 living with them, 72.3% were married couples living together, 8.5% had a female householder with no husband present, and 17.0% were non-families. 13.8% of all households were made up of individuals, and 8.2% had someone living alone who was 65 years of age or older. The average household size was 3.26 and the average family size was 3.55.

2000 census
In 2000, the town population was spread out, with 34.6% under the age of 18, 3.5% from 18 to 24, 24.5% from 25 to 44, 26.2% from 45 to 64, and 11.2% who were 65 years of age or older. The median age was 39 years. For every 100 females, there were 96.4 males. For every 100 females age 18 and over, there were 85.5 males.

In 2000, the median income for a household in the town was $136,686, and the median income for a family was $141,557. Males had a median income of $81,193 versus $58,750 for females. The per capita income for the town was $73,053.

As of 2000, speakers of English as a first language accounted for 55.01% of the population, while Spanish accounted for 35.09% of the populace, speakers of Hebrew made up 4.40%, French was at 3.85%, and Russian was the mother tongue for 1.65% of residents.

Education
Miami-Dade County Public Schools serves Golden Beach.

All residents are zoned to Norman S. Edelcup/Sunny Isles Beach K-8 in Sunny Isles Beach for elementary and K–8. Prior to August 2008 residents were zoned to Highland Oaks Elementary School. Residents who want a standard comprehensive middle school instead of a K–8 may choose to enroll at a separate middle school, Highland Oaks Middle School. Alonzo and Tracy Mourning Senior High Biscayne Bay Campus is the zoned senior high school. Prior to the opening of Mourning in 2009, Dr. Michael M. Krop Senior High School served Eastern Shores.

References

External links

 

Towns in Miami-Dade County, Florida
Beaches of Miami-Dade County, Florida
Towns in Florida
Populated coastal places in Florida on the Atlantic Ocean
Beaches of Florida